Neptis exaleuca is a butterfly in the family Nymphalidae. It is found from Cameroon to the Democratic Republic of the Congo and in Uganda and Tanzania.

Subspecies
Neptis exaleuca exaleuca (Cameroon to western Democratic Republic of the Congo)
Neptis exaleuca suffusa Rothschild, 1918 (eastern Democratic Republic of the Congo, Uganda, north-western Tanzania)

References

Butterflies described in 1894
exaleuca
Butterflies of Africa